Durbaniopsis is a genus of butterflies in the family Lycaenidae. The single species is endemic to the Afrotropics.

Species
Durbaniopsis saga (Trimen, 1883)

External links
Durbaniopsis at Markku Savela's Lepidoptera and some other life forms

Poritiinae
Lycaenidae genera